Antastulu is a 1965 Indian Telugu-language drama film produced by V. B. Rajendra Prasad and directed by V. Madhusudhana Rao. It stars  Akkineni Nageswara Rao, Bhanumathi Ramakrishna, Krishna Kumari with music composed by K. V. Mahadevan. The film won the National Film Award for Best Feature Film in Telugu in 1965. The film won two Nandi Awards.

Plot
Zamindar Raja Jaganatha Rao is affluent and obsessed with discipline who doesn't show any preference between family members and workers; if anyone dares to break the rules, he punishes them harshly. So, his wife Roopa Devi and elder son Raghu obliges accordingly, whereas the younger son Chinnababu finds these rules too annoying. Jaganatha Rao learns about Chinababu's ideas, warns him twice but he does not listen, so, furious Jaganatha Rao seeks to punish him when he dies out of shock. As a result, Raghu wants to leave the house when Jaganatha Rao allots him a huge amount and asks him to live a rich lifestyle and understand life.

But unfortunately, Raghu goes into clutches of a malevolent person Naagu who turns him as a spoiled brat. After some time, Raghu tries to trap a beautiful girl Mala but looking at her virtue he reforms himself and gets rid of Naagu. Parallelly, at the palace, Jaganatha Rao breaks down mentally when his past haunts him, having aware of his father's condition Raghu returns. Before his death, Jaganatha Rao shares his sin that he is a deceiver of a poor girl Raaji, they two have a child Rani who is living as a street dancer. Here Jaganatha Rao expresses his wish to make her an equivalent without proclaiming, in order to protect the family prestige. After that, Raghu somehow convinces Rani and brings her home which is not accepted by Roopa Devi.

At one point, Rani finds out the truth and wants to acquire her identity, so, there onwards, she starts teasing everyone in the house when distressed Roopa Devi orders to neck out Rani which Raghu cannot do so. During the plight, he too accompanies Rani when Mala also lands and suspects their relation but afterward, realizes Raghu's righteousness. Nevertheless, Rani does not leave her challenge and suffers Raghu a lot. Ultimately, she picks up Naagu, plays a drama by introducing him as her fiancé but Raghu does not yield. On the other side, wicked Naagu ploys to double-cross which are fezzed by Rani when angered Naagu reveals the birth secret of Rani. At last, Roopa Devi realizes her mistake and accepts Rani as her daughter. Raghu marries Mala.

Cast

Crew
Art: G. V. Subba Rao
Choreography: Heeralal, K. S. Reddy
Dialogues: Acharya Aatreya
Lyrics: Acharya Aatreya, Arudra, Kosaraju
Playback: Ghantasala, P. Susheela, Bhanumathi Ramakrishna, Madhavapeddi Satyam
Music: K. V. Mahadevan
Story: Javar Seetharaman
Editing: Satyam
Cinematography: C. Nageswara Rao
Producer: V. B. Rajendra Prasad
Screenplay - Director:V. Madhusudan Rao 
Banner: Jagapathi Art Pictures
Release Date: 27 May 1965

Soundtrack

Music composed by K. V. Mahadevan. Music released on Audio Company.

Awards
 National Film Award for Best Feature Film in Telugu - V. B. Rajendra Prasad
 Filmfare Award for Best Film – Telugu - V. B. Rajendra Prasad
 Rashtrapati Award from Govt of India for Best Actress - Bhanumathi Ramakrishna - 1965

Nandi Awards - 1965
 Best Feature Film - Gold - V. B. Rajendra Prasad
 Second Best Story Writer - Javar Seetharaman

References

External links
 

1965 films
1960s Telugu-language films
Indian black-and-white films
Indian drama films
Films directed by V. Madhusudhana Rao
Films scored by K. V. Mahadevan
Best Telugu Feature Film National Film Award winners
1965 drama films